Beck Hammock is a neighborhood in Sanford, Florida. It was named "Beck Hammock" after the Beck family that settled in this area. In an obituary in the Sanford Herald, the earliest mention of the family was Mrs. Jay Beck and it states she moved here from South Carolina in the late 19th century.

Originally, cattle were brought to this area by the Spanish around 1565. The cattle industry thrived in Florida by the 19th century. The Beck family was one of these ranching families. The first known appearance of the name "Beck Hammock" on a map was approximately 1928.

Today this area is under redevelopment. Housing subdivisions and commercial properties are on what used to be orange groves and grazing land. The nearby Orlando Sanford International Airport is under expansion as well. There are no street names or references to the original name of this location.

References
The Sanford Herald

Geography of Seminole County, Florida
Unincorporated communities in Seminole County, Florida
Unincorporated communities in Florida